Rick Kamla (born July 19, 1969) is a television personality for NBA TV and CBS Sports. He was also the former midday co-host (10 a.m.-2 p.m.) with John Michaels on all-sports radio station 92.9 The Game in Atlanta.

Kamla has been a studio commentator for the NBA since January 2003. Currently, Kamla hosts Game Time on NBA TV. Kamla also contributes play-by-play to NBA, NBADL, WNBA, USA Basketball, Summer League and Euroleague games.

Early life
Kamla graduated from the University of Minnesota in 1992 with a degree in history and a minor in Speech-Communication. While attending the University of Minnesota, Kamla covered the Golden Gophers on the student-run radio station KUOM.

Professional career
In 1994, Kamla started his sports journalism career as a part-time writer for Fantasy Football Weekly, which was based in Minneapolis. By 1998, Kamla was the full-time senior editor for both Fantasy Football (American) and basketball on fanball.com.

Kamla was hired to host the fantasy show "Virtual GM" on NBA TV.

References

External links
 Rick Kamla's bio from NBA-TV

University of Minnesota College of Liberal Arts alumni
National Basketball Association broadcasters
NBA G League broadcasters
Women's National Basketball Association announcers
Living people
1969 births